VG (IUPAC name: O,O-diethyl S-[2-(diethylamino)ethyl] phosphorothioate) (also called Amiton or Tetram) is a "V-series" nerve agent chemically  similar to the better-known VX nerve agent. Tetram is the common Russian name for the substance.  Amiton was the trade name for the substance when it was marketed as an insecticide by ICI in the mid-1950s.

Chemical
With a toxicity of about 1/10 that of VX, i.e. similar to that of sarin, it is now considered too dangerous for use in agriculture but unlike other nerve agents it is classified under Schedule 2 of the Chemical Weapons Convention rather than the more restrictive Schedule 1. It is thought that North Korea may have military stockpiles of this chemical
.

During the early 1950s at least three chemical companies working on organo-phosphorus insecticides independently discovered the severe toxicity of these chemicals. In 1952, Dr. Ranajit Ghosh, a chemist working for ICI at their Plant Protection Laboratories at Jealott's Hill was investigating the potential of organophosphate esters of substituted aminoethanethiols for use as pesticides. Like the earlier German investigators of organophosphates in the late 1930s who had discovered the G-series nerve agents, Dr. Ghosh discovered that their action on cholinesterase made them effective pesticides. One of them, Amiton, was described in a 1955 paper by Ghosh and another chemist, J. F. Newman, as being particularly effective against mites. It was brought to market as an insecticide by the company in 1954 but was subsequently withdrawn as too toxic. 

The toxicity of these substances had not passed unnoticed by the British Government, as some of the compounds had already been sent to their research facility at Porton Down for evaluation.  Some of the chemicals from this class of compounds formed a new group of nerve agents called V Agents. The British Government unilaterally renounced chemical and biological weapons in 1956, although in 1958 traded their research on VG technology with the United States Government in exchange for information on thermonuclear weapons. The US then went into production of large amounts of the chemically similar, but much more toxic VX in 1961.

It is classified as an extremely hazardous substance in the United States as defined in Section 302 of the U.S. Emergency Planning and Community Right-to-Know Act (42 U.S.C. 11002), and is subject to strict reporting requirements by facilities which produce, store, or use it in significant quantities.

References

Diethylamino compounds
Acetylcholinesterase inhibitors
V-series nerve agents
Organothiophosphate esters
Ethyl esters